Elections to provincial, city, county, district, town, neighborhood, village and workers' district people's assemblies were held in North Korea on December 3, 1963.

In the elections, 2,517 provincial people's assembly deputies, 14,303 city, county and district people's assembly deputies and 70,250 town, neighborhood, village and workers' district people's assembly deputies were elected.

Voter turnout was reported to be 100%, with candidates allegedly receiving a 100% approval rate.

References

1963 in North Korea
North Korea
Local elections in North Korea
December 1963 events in Asia